Roberto Narducci (14 August 1887 – 10 February 1979) was an Italian architect and engineer of the Modernist and Novocento movements.

Life
Narducci was born in Rome, into a middle-class family.  After receiving his technical 'licenzia' in 1903–04, he obtained a diploma in architectural decoration from the Arts and Industry Museum of Rome in 1909.  In the same year he won a competition to become a designer for the Italian state railway company, Ferrovie dello Stato.

From 1920-21 he enrolled in the three-year program at the Regia Scuola Superiori di Architettura, and from there he received his degree in Civil Architecture in 1923.  In 1930 passed the qualification examination to become a practicing professional engineer.

In his lifetime, working under the Ministry of Communications (now within the Ministry of Transport) he designed approximately 40 railway stations, both new buildings and post-war reconstructions and about ten Post Offices.   He frequently worked with his colleague Angiolo Mazzoni.  He died in Rome, aged 91.

Structures
Buildings
 Palazzo delle Poste e Telegrafi di Bari, 1931 plan
 Palazzo delle Poste e Telegrafi di Rovigo, 1927-1930
Railway stations
 Albenga railway station, 1930
 Battipaglia railway station, 1930
 Levanto railway station
 Loano railway station plan
 Santa Flavia railway station, 1932
 Redipuglia railway station, 1936
 Roma Ostiense railway station, 1940
 Ventimiglia railway station
 Verona Porta Nuova railway station
 Viareggio railway station

Bibliography
M. Giacomelli, Roberto Narducci (1887-1979) architetto-ingegnere del Ministero delle Comunicazioni. E. Godoli e A. I. Lima, a cura di. Architettura ferroviaria in Italia Novecento. Dario Flaccovio Editore, 2004, 
A. Morgera, Roberto Narducci e la monumentalizzazione delle stazioni ferroviarie. I casi di Venezia Santa Lucia, Redipuglia e Roma Ostiense. 1934-1938, tesi di laurea, Trieste 2006, relatore P. Nicoloso, correlatore B. Boccazzi Mazza.
A. Morgera (ed.), La stazione di Redipuglia di Roberto Narducci, exhibition catalogue for "Sentieri di Pace" / Pro Loco di Fogliano Redipuglia, Fogliano Redipuglia 2007.

References

External links
 Arch. Narducci Roberto. Fascismo - Architettura - Arte / Arte fascista web site

1887 births
1979 deaths
Architects from Rome
20th-century Italian architects
Italian fascist architecture
Engineers from Rome
20th-century Italian engineers